Edward Hicks Hohnhorst (January 31, 1885 – March 28, 1916) was a Major League Baseball first baseman who played for two seasons. He played in 18 games for the Cleveland Naps during the 1910 Cleveland Naps season and 15 games during the 1912 Cleveland Naps season.

Death
Hohnhorst became a police officer in Covington, Kentucky. In 1914 he shot a suspect during an arrest. Although he was found to be blameless for the death, Hohnhorst became guilt-ridden, which led to alcoholism, lack of sleep and stomach pains. Hohnhorst committed suicide with his service revolver, with the death certificate citing "temporary insanity" as the reason for his death.

References

External links

1885 births
1916 suicides
Major League Baseball first basemen
Cleveland Naps players
Anderson Electricians players
Augusta Tourists players
San Antonio Bronchos players
Toledo Mud Hens players
Indianapolis Indians players
Indianapolis Hoosiers (minor league) players
Austin Senators players
St. Louis Terriers players
Baseball players from Kentucky
Sportspeople from Covington, Kentucky
Suicides by firearm in Kentucky